Maria Sanchez and Nicola Slater were the defending champions, having won the event in 2013, but both players chose to participate with different partners this year. Sanchez partnered Sharon Fichman as the fourth seeds, losing in the final whilst Slater partnered with Emily Webley-Smith, having been given a wildcard berth, losing in the quarterfinals.

Jocelyn Rae and Anna Smith won the title, defeating Fichman and Sanchez in the final, 7–6(7–5), 4–6, [10–5].

Seeds

Draw

References 
 Draw

Aegon Trophy - Women's Doubles
Aegon Trophy